Byron James Ford is an Australian former professional rugby league footballer who last played for Newtown in the second tier NSW Cup competition in which he played for them in the 2008 NSW Cup grand final. He previously played in England with Hull Kingston Rovers and Oldham, helping the Roughyeds get to the 2007 National League Two Grand Final. He was to join the Newcastle Knights in 2009 on a 2-year contract but was banned from playing rugby league until June 2010.

He also represented the Cook Islands rugby league team on several occasions after qualifying to play for them via the parent rule.

He is also a member of the Maroubra surf gang the Bra Boys.

References

External links
Byran Ford Player Profile
Byron Ford rleague.com stats
Bryon Ford Super League stats

1982 births
Australian rugby league players
Australian people of Irish descent
Australian people of Scottish descent
Australian people of Cook Island descent
Cook Islands national rugby league team players
Hull Kingston Rovers players
Newtown Jets NSW Cup players
Oldham R.L.F.C. players
Rugby league wingers
Living people